Jankowski (feminine: Jankowska; plural: Jankowscy) is the 13th most common surname in Poland (69,280 people in 2009). Many village estates were named Jankowa or Jankowice in 13th and 14th century Poland, producing at least twelve unrelated families with this surname. Over thirty place names with 'Jankow' (derived from Jan (John)) as a prefix remain in modern Poland. In most cases, the originator of the surname was a landowner of a reasonably sized estate (tens of hectares as a minimum but could be over one thousand hectares). Landowners often formed their surnames by adding the suffix '-ski', meaning 'of', to the estate name. They generally had considerable prestige and legal rights as the use of '-ski' indicated their adoption into the Polish nobility termed szlachta. To distinguish the different Jankowski szlachta families, they each used an additional identifier signifying their armorial crest or clan, termed 'herb' in Polish (see Boniecki, "Herbarsz Polski").

Related surnames

Diversity of families named Jankowski
The most common coats of arms to contain Jankowscy are as follows: Amadej, Cielatkowa, Jastrzebiec (multiple synonyms see below), Junosza and Nowina. Less common coats of arms that may contain Jankowscy are Bialynia, Korab, Kuszaba, Ogonczyk, Poraj, Rawicz, and Strzemie. Each denotes an unrelated family originating in different locations throughout Poland. Each family has its own history and line of descent. Some like Jankowski h. Jastrzebiec are from the North-East of ancient Poland, while others are from the North-West with German/Prussian influences or from the South with Bohemian influences. With the partition of the Polish–Lithuanian Commonwealth, the subsequent Polish diaspora and the many ethnic and religious pogroms resulting in comprehensive name changes, these secondary identifiers were largely forgotten and descendants may no longer know which family to whom they are connected. Furthermore, the surname Jankowski can be phoneticized in a number of different ways, with even the same family varying its spelling.

The complexity of the evolution of these families can be illustrated well by the Jankowski h. Jastrzebiec family which is initially of Polish origin but has subsequently major Belarusian-Lithuanian influences.

Jankowski h. Jastrzebiec

Origins
The Jastrzebiec clan is the oldest in Poland and has the largest number of derivative 'branch family' names associated with it. The subsequent families adopt the same crest of the Jastrzebiec clan which is the blue shield with a gold horse shoe encircling a 'Maltese cross' and a goshawk above. The name Jastrzebiec has several synonyms representing regional descriptors for a goshawk; Accipiter, Bolesta, Boleścic, Jastrząb, Jastrząbek, Kamiona, Łazęka, Lubrza.

During the 11th and 12th centuries, the Polish state was fragmented amongst rival Royal Dukes, causing instability. The szlachta including the Jastrzebiec, in turn formed a stable and successful semi-feudal backbone allowing a decentralised state to evolve. This subsequently resulted in many new branches of the szlachta, in the 13th century, which now comprised up to 10% of the population. For example, the subsequent 'Jankowski branch' of the Jastrzebiec descendants (written Jankowski herbu Jastrzebiec) were probably resident in the region of Łomża (North Eastern Poland), from the villages of Jankowo Młodzianowo and Jankowo Skarbowo. In the following decades, the immediate descendants of this Jankowski family also held lands further north and east, south of Vilnius (now Lithuania), west of Minsk (now Belarus), and near the town of Suwałki (still in Poland). The nobility including the Jankowski h. Jastrzebiec were given special impetus by Casimir III the Great in the early 14th century who formally adopted them as 'leaders of warriors' to replace the levée en masse used by previous kings. It is likely that a proportion of Jankowski lands were in part granted to family members by the Kings of Poland following acts of military devotion to the state against the many hostile invaders including Germans, Teutons, Russians, Mongols and Tatars.

Migration 
The Jankowski h. Jastrzebiec family members adapted to the local Eastern European customs and language and are now also known by the Lithuanian form Jankauskas and in the Russian Cyrillic form as Янковский. Progressive eastward migration was particularly prominent from the 15th century onwards, when the Treaty of the Union of Horodło was signed, granting Polish nobility the freedom to settle in the vast underpopulated fringes of Lithuania and Belarus. This was further endorsed by the Union of Lublin a century later. The 16th century was also in many ways the golden age of Poland with the rural agricultural economy booming especially with grain exports to central and western European markets as well as Britain. In this period the Jankowski family consolidated their position and expanded their lands and with surplus income educating their families in the Renaissance style. In the 17th century, the Polish–Lithuanian Commonwealth was now the largest country in the whole of Europe and the decentralised nature of the country's government relied on semi-autonomous distinct regional principalities. Therefore, while members of this family were predominantly owners of farms of all sizes, some undertook executive administration for the regional states including posts as privy councillors, judges, army reservists and regional politicians.

In the 18th century, the rule of both Augustus the II and III led to external wars and internal chaos impacting on all but the largest magnates who further expanded their lands. As a consequence even the members of the Jankowski family as nobility with means 'middle szlachta' (termed szlachta zamozńa) would have struggled to maintain their lands. By the 19th century, things would get even worse as Poland had ceased to exist as an independent state and was under foreign occupation. The new administration was frequently harsh sometimes even repressive making the long established feudal agricultural economy even more difficult and even uneconomic. Furthermore, exploitation of the abundant natural resources, as a consequence of the industrial revolution spreading from the West, was hampered by an inefficient infrastructure. A small proportion of the Jankowski family moved west into continental Europe in the mid 19th century, predominantly France due to shared cultural, religious and military traditions. However, the majority of the poorer members of the Jankowski family emigrated predominantly to America via German and English ports. In the early 20th century the remaining progeny of this family with sufficient means diversified into the professions including civil and industrial engineering as well as the medical sciences.

World War II 
In World War II, the members of this family suffered many military and ethnic-based casualties in the following incidents; the Polish Defensive War September – October 1939, Katyn massacre and the related Smolensk region massacres, Nazi concentration camps, Nazi crimes against ethnic Poles, Soviet Gulags and military deaths in resistance movements or as anti-Axis members of the British, Soviet or French armies. This led to a collapse of the kinship by 20–50% in several branches of the family while some became extinct altogether. Furthermore, the loss of the heart of the Jankowski h. Jastrzebiec lands in the Polish Eastern borderlands (Kresy), to the Soviet Union, led to a large proportion of the surviving Jankowski descendants relocating west into new Poland. However, a second wave of political emigration overseas also followed. This time, a sizable proportion went to the UK and its commonwealth, as many Poles including the Jankowski diaspora had fought with distinction in the II Corps (Poland) of the British Army and the Polish Air Force as part of the Royal Air Force during the war.

Notable individuals

Jankowski/Jankowska
 Bruce Jankowski (born 1948), American football player
 Henryk Jankowski (1936–2010), Polish Catholic priest
 Horst Jankowski (1936–1998), German pianist
 Jacek Jankowski (born 1969), Polish diplomat
 Jadwiga Jankowska (born 1951), Polish film actress
 Jan Moor-Jankowski (1924–2005), Polish-American zoologist and resistance fighter in World War II
 Jan Stanisław Jankowski (1882–1953), Polish politician and resistance leader in World War II
 Janusz Jankowski (born 1961), British physician
 Katarzyna Jankowska (born 1994), Polish athlete
 Lou Jankowski (1931–2010), Canadian ice hockey player
 Maciej Jankowski (born 1990), Polish footballer
 Marian Jankowski (1931–2017), Polish weightlifter
 Mark Jankowski (born 1994), Canadian ice hockey player
 Martin Jankowski (born 1965), German writer and poet
 Michał Jankowski (1842–1912), Polish naturalist
 Mike Jankowski (born 1976), American skiing and snowboarding coach
 Miłosz Jankowski (born 1990), Polish rower
 Paul Jankowski (born 1950), American historian
 Roman Jankowski (born 1957), Polish speedway rider
 Ron Yankowski (born 1946), American football player
 Stanisław Jankowski (1911–2002), Polish military officer and architect
 Tadeusz Jankowski (born 1930), Polish cross-country skier
 Travis Jankowski (born 1991), American baseball player
 Wojciech Jankowski (born 1963), Polish rower
 Zenon Jankowski (born 1937), Polish astronaut

Yankovsky/Yankovskaya
 Filipp Yankovsky (born 1968), Russian actor
 George Yankovsky (1879–1956), Russian tiger hunter
 Igor Yankovsky (born 1951), Russian actor, son of Rostislav and nephew of Oleg
 Oleg Yankovsky (1944–2009), Russian actor
 Rostislav Yankovsky (born 1930), Soviet actor, brother of Oleg
 Valery Yankovsky (1911–2010), Russian writer

Other forms
 Caitlin Yankowskas (born 1990), American pair skater
 Carl Yankowski (born 1948), American business executive
 George Yankowski (born 1922), American baseball player

See also
 
 
 Janowski
 Jankowskia
 Janikowski

References

Polish-language surnames
Polish toponymic surnames